Symphysa amoenalis is a moth in the family Crambidae. It is found in Brazil and Panama.

References

Moths described in 1862
Evergestinae